The Journal of Analytical Atomic Spectrometry is a peer-reviewed scientific journal publishing original (primary) research and review articles covering all areas of modern spectrometry including fundamental theory, practice and analytical applications. It is published monthly by the Royal Society of Chemistry, the editor-in-chief is May Copsey. The journal replaced Annual Reports on Analytical Atomic Spectroscopy (1971–1984) in 1986 and has a 2020 impact factor of 4.023.

Article types 
The journal publishes research papers, technical notes, urgent communications, and review articles.

References

External links 
 

Chemistry journals
Royal Society of Chemistry academic journals
Publications established in 1986
English-language journals
Monthly journals